Flannan may refer to:

 Flannán mac Toirrdelbaig, saint and patron of Killaloe
 Flannan Isles, a small island group in the Outer Hebrides of Scotland
 Flannan Isles Lighthouse, lighthouse on Eilean Mòr, one of the Flannan Isles
 St Flannan's College, Irish secondary school
 Flannan Isle, poem by Wilfrid Wilson Gibson